The French destroyer Aigle was the lead ship of her class of destroyers (contre-torpilleurs) built for the French Navy during the 1920s.

Service
During World War II, Aigle was engaged in operations to transport gold bars several times. In November 1939, she escorted Force 'Z' ships (the battleship Lorraine and two cruisers of the La Galissonnière class) until they reached the Atlantic. In March–April 1940, Aigle provided cover and later escorted the ships of Force 'X' back. Besides that, Aigle was regularly deployed to escort convoys with troops, heading from the North African ports to Marseille. The last combat operation in which the large destroyer participated was a raid on Genoa on the night of 13/14 June 1940, as part of Operation Vado, where she had to fend off the attacks of Italian torpedo boats.

After France surrendered to Germany in June 1940 during World War II, Aigle served with the navy of Vichy France. She was among the ships of the French fleet scuttled at Toulon, France, on 27 November 1942. Later refloated, she was sunk a second time at Toulon by United States Army Air Forces bombers on 24 November 1943. Her wreck later was again salvaged and scrapped.

Notes

References

 
 

World War II warships scuttled at Toulon
Aigle-class destroyers
1931 ships
Ships built in France
Maritime incidents in November 1942
Maritime incidents in November 1943